Ödön Bárdi (5 January 1877, Pilisborosjenő – 24 June 1958, Budapest) was a Hungarian actor.

Selected filmography
 A Csodagyerek (1920)
 Lord Arthur Savile's Crime (1920)
 Márciusi mese (1934)
 I May See Her Once a Week (1937)
 Pesti mese (1937)
 Hotel Kikelet (1937)
 Azurexpress (1938)
 A Tanítónő (1945)
 Professor Hannibal (1956)

External links

1877 births
1958 deaths
Hungarian male film actors
Hungarian male silent film actors
People from Pest County
20th-century Hungarian male actors